The 1926 Georgia Tech Golden Tornado baseball team represented the Georgia Tech Golden Tornado of the Georgia Institute of Technology in the 1926 NCAA baseball season, winning the Southern Conference.

References

Georgia Tech
Georgia Tech Yellow Jackets baseball seasons
Georgia Tech baseball
Southern Conference baseball champion seasons